This is a list of Hungarian football transfers in the winter transfer window 2018-19 by club. Only transfers in Nemzeti Bajnokság I, and Nemzeti Bajnokság II are included.

Nemzeti Bajnokság I

Budapest Honvéd

In:

Out:

Debrecen

In:

Out:

Diósgyőr

In:

Out:

Ferencváros

In:

Out:

Kisvárda

In:

Out:

Mezőkövesd

In:

Out:

MTK Budapest

In:

Out:

Paks

In:

Out:

Szombathely

In:

Out:

Puskás Akadémia

In:

Out:

Videoton

In:

Out:

Nemzeti Bajnokság II

Balmazújváros

In:

Out:

Békéscsaba

In:

Out:

See also
2018–19 Nemzeti Bajnokság I
2018–19 Nemzeti Bajnokság II
2018–19 Nemzeti Bajnokság III
2018–19 Magyar Kupa

References

External links
Official site of the Hungarian Football Association
Official site of the Nemzeti Bajnokság I

Hungarian
Football transfers
Football transfers
2018-19